Daniel Kuzozvirava Shumba is a former Zimbabwe Army colonel and businessman; he came back into active politics and rose to Masvingo Provincial Chairman and member of the Central Committee [(the highest organ)] of the ZANU-PF political party. He is a son of a founding member of ZANU, and had a strong political background. He underwent Zanla's basic military training at Chisamba, Zambia, in 1978 before continuing with his academics. Shumba's accolades extend to having served in the Special Forces (The Parachute Group) of the Zimbabwe National Army from 1983 to 1989. He established himself as a fearless fighter.

In 2006, he was fired from the party in a falling-out over the unresolved issue of the Tsholotsho agenda. Later in that year, he announced the creation of his own party, the United People's Party. The Tsholotsho issue has since been found to have been a fallacy. He did not run in the 2008 Zimbabwean presidential election, but went on to win an order in the Supreme Court of Zimbabwe.

In September 2009, Dr Daniel Shumba resigned from opposition politics and rejoined Zanu-PF. He was a highly respected and well regarded member of the Zanu-PF party, and represent it and won in Masvingo Urban constituency, in the July 2013 National Elections. Dr Daniel Shumba was a member of Zanu-PF"s highest organ, the Central Committee, and was appointed (in December, 2014) Deputy Secretary for Transport and Welfare, in the Zanu-PF's Politburo.

It had become clear that Dr Daniel Shumba's principled position on the broader issues of national policy, corruption, and constitutionalism created serious conflicts within the Zanu PF system. He left Zanu PF in December 2017 following the coup, leading to the formation of the United Democratic Alliance (UDA). Dr Daniel Shumba is the founding President of the UDA. He contested the highly controversial July 30, 2018 Presidential elections. He was a Respondent in the Constitutional Court Application challenging the results of Presidential election. His Party's manifesto and national turnaround strategies are said to be unmatched in terms of both content and process ownership.

He is a well mannered person known to be open, yet firm and direct in his dealings. He is a highly regarded parliamentarian and seats on its highest committee, the Standing Rules & Orders Committee (SROC), he was an influential and key member of the Justice & Legal Portfolio committee, and was also the esteemed Chairman of the Mines and Energy Portfolio committee.

Dr Daniel Shumba has represented Zimbabwe at the Africa Institute of Legislative Forum (2013) in Abuja, Nigeria, and also lead the Zimbabwe's monitoring delegations to the 2014 South Africa National Elections, and the 2014 Namibia National Elections. He is also a member of a number of regional and international economic bodies (including the World Economic Forum).

Dr Daniel Shumba was the head of delegation to the ACP and the joint ACP-EU Parliamentary Assembly. He chaired the ACP Standing Committee on Political Affairs at the 40th session of the ACP Parliamentary Assembly, and also chaired the Political Affairs Bureau at the 30th session of the ACP-EU Joint Parliamentary Assembly in Brussels on the 4 and 8 December 2015.

On 18 January 2018, following the coup and political gamesmanship in Zanu PF, Shumba was withdrawn from the Parliament of Zimbabwe. This move was necessitated by his relentless efforts in exposing corruption, fraud, and other delinquencies by the Zanu PF government.

He was educated in Zimbabwe, Zambia and the UK. He holds an MBA and a PhD in 'International Business Strategy'. He has businesses in IT, Hospitality, Mining and Telecommunications. Dr Daniel Shumba operates between Zimbabwe and South Africa. Shumba is a well known strategist and consults for business, and NGOs in Africa.

Shumba has invested across many sectors of business and sits on many corporate boards and is a member of many international bodies. Noted as a pundit on regional business issues, he provides his services within the SADC region.

Upon leaving the Defense Forces, Shumba emerged as a leading entrepreneur after setting up and managing Systems Technology, an ITC business. Systems Technology was a leading supplier of ITC equipment and services to the government of Zimbabwe, Educational Institutions, Mining sector, banks, and to other corporates.

He is a founding shareholder of Econet Zimbabwe, holding 25% shares through Mascom Zimbabwe  and 10% shares through TSM Holdings. He financed Econet and bought his shares through a debt to equity swap (from  cash advances, computer, electronic and networking equipment and services). Dr Daniel Shumba led the Mascom Botswana bidding process and was instrumental in the behind the scenes lobbying.

Shumba also founded and was the CEO of TeleAccess Zimbabwe (Second NTO), and TeleAccess Global Corporation (TAGC). TAGC led the team of international partners and won the Comtel Broadband bid by COMESA to roll out and manage fiber networks in 21 member countries.

Shumba is a progressive who has gone past the single-dimensional political agenda, and is focussed at unlocking value as both politician and businessman. "The risks in politics, brings out the opportunistic nature of people. Let us not confuse democracy or capitalism with an ideological revolution. I rather measure my national contribution by playing a positive role in rebuilding Zimbabwe. It is unwise for one to continue running in a wrong direction, when common sense tell you to review your strategy", Shumba was quoted at a business conference.

Shumba has launched The Advocacy Forum (The AF). He will roll out country chapters across Africa. The Advocacy Forum's main agenda is to ensure and monitor national adherence to the Rule of Law, and the tenets of Constitutionalism. The Advocacy Forum will work and collaborate with other partners in its advocacy.

References

Year of birth missing (living people)
Living people
Zimbabwean politicians